Earl of Elgin  is a title in the Peerage of Scotland, created in 1633 for Thomas Bruce, 3rd Lord Kinloss. He was later created Baron Bruce, of Whorlton in the County of York, in the Peerage of England on 30 July 1641. The Earl of Elgin is the hereditary Clan Chief of Clan Bruce.

History

The family descended from the Bruces of Clackmannan, whose ancestor was Thomas de Bruys. According to Sir James Balfour Paul, there is no evidence that this branch of the family was descended from Robert the Bruce (King Robert I), despite claims that Thomas was an illegitimate son of the king. However, King Robert's son David II made a grant of land in 1359 to Robert Bruce referring to him as  dilecto consanguineo suo (our beloved cousin). It was generally accepted that Clackmannan branch descended from John de Brus who was a younger son of Robert de Brus, 5th Lord of Annandale.

The first earl was succeeded by his son, Robert, who also was created Earl of Ailesbury in the Peerage of England. The two Earldoms continued united until the death of the fourth Earl of Elgin, when the Ailesbury and Baron Bruce (of Whorlton) titles became extinct, and the Elgin title passed to the Earl of Kincardine; the Lordship of Kinloss became dormant. Thereafter, the Earldoms of Elgin and Kincardine have remained united.

The most famous Earl was the 7th Earl, who removed and transported to Britain the so-called Elgin Marbles from the Parthenon. In Dublin there are roads that come from the Earl's titles. These are Elgin Road and Ailesbury Road.

As well as the titles Earl of Elgin and Earl of Kincardine, Lord Elgin also holds the titles Lord Bruce of Kinloss (created 1604), Lord Bruce of Torry (1647) and Baron Elgin, of Elgin in Scotland (1849). The first two are in the Peerage of Scotland; the third is in the Peerage of the United Kingdom.

The Lordship of Kinloss held by the first four Earls was inherited on the death of the 4th Earl by the 3rd Duke of Chandos. Through his daughter it passed to the Dukes of Buckingham and Chandos, and is now held by these Dukes' heir of line.

The family seat is Broomhall House, three miles south-west of Dunfermline, Scotland.

Feudal Barons of Clackmannan
Thomas de Bruys, 1st Baron of Clackmannan (died before 1348)
Robert de Bruys, 2nd Baron of Clackmannan (died before 1406)
Sir Robert Bruce, 3rd Baron of Clackmannan (died 1428)
Sir David Bruce, 4th Baron of Clackmannan
John Bruce, 5th Baron of Clackmannan (died 1473)
Sir David Bruce, 6th Baron of Clackmannan (died circa 1500)
Sir David Bruce, 7th Baron of Clackmannan (died after 1556)
Sir Edward Bruce, 8th Baron of Clackmannan (1505–1565)
second son, Edward, created Lord Bruce of Kinloss in 1604

Lords Bruce of Kinloss (1604)
Edward Bruce, 1st Lord Bruce of Kinloss (1548–1611)
Edward Bruce, 2nd Lord Bruce of Kinloss (1594–1613)
Thomas Bruce, 3rd Lord Bruce of Kinloss, 1st Baron Bruce (1599–1663) (created Earl of Elgin 1633) (created Baron Bruce of Whorlton 1641)

Earls of Elgin (1633)
Thomas Bruce, 1st Earl of Elgin, 1st Baron Bruce of Whorlton (1599–1663)
Robert Bruce, 2nd Earl of Elgin, 1st Earl of Ailesbury, 2nd Baron Bruce of Whorlton (1627–1685)
Hon. Robert Bruce (died 1652)
Hon. Edward Bruce (died 1662)
Thomas Bruce, 3rd Earl of Elgin, 2nd Earl of Ailesbury, 3rd Baron Bruce of Whorlton (1656–1741)
Robert Bruce, Lord Bruce (1679–before 1741)
Charles Bruce, 4th Earl of Elgin, 3rd Earl of Ailesbury, 4th Baron Bruce of Whorlton, 1st Baron Bruce of Skelton (1682–1747) (created Baron Bruce of Skelton 1746)
Hon. Robert Bruce (died 1738)
Charles Bruce, 5th Earl of Elgin and 9th Earl of Kincardine (1732–1771)
William Robert Bruce, 6th Earl of Elgin and 10th Earl of Kincardine (1764–1771)
Thomas Bruce, 7th Earl of Elgin, 11th Earl of Kincardine (1766–1841) – of the eponymous Elgin Marbles
George Charles Constantine Bruce, Lord Bruce (1800–1840)
James Bruce, 8th Earl of Elgin, 12th Earl of Kincardine (1811–1863) – of the sacking of the Summer Palace
Victor Alexander Bruce, 9th Earl of Elgin, 13th Earl of Kincardine (1849–1917)
Edward James Bruce, 10th Earl of Elgin, 14th Earl of Kincardine (1881–1968)
Andrew Douglas Alexander Thomas Bruce, 11th Earl of Elgin, 15th Earl of Kincardine (b. 1924)

The heir apparent is the present holder's son Charles Edward Bruce, Lord Bruce (b. 1961).
The heir apparent's heir apparent is his son James Andrew Charles Robert Bruce, Master of Bruce (b. 1991).

Family tree

See also
Clan Bruce
Elgin Marbles
Palermo Fragment

References

Attribution

 
Earldoms in the Peerage of Scotland
Noble titles created in 1633
Clan Bruce
Bruce family
Peerages created with special remainders